Shackleton is an impact crater that lies at the lunar south pole. The peaks along the crater's rim are exposed to almost continual sunlight, while the interior is perpetually in shadow. The low-temperature interior of this crater functions as a cold trap that may capture and freeze volatiles shed during comet impacts on the Moon. Measurements by the Lunar Prospector spacecraft showed higher than normal amounts of hydrogen within the crater, which may indicate the presence of water ice. The crater is named after Antarctic explorer Ernest Shackleton.

Description 

The rotational axis of the Moon passes through Shackleton, near the rim. From the Earth, it is viewed edge-on in a region of rough, cratered terrain. It is located within the South Pole–Aitken basin on a massif. The rim is slightly raised about the surrounding surface and it has an outer rampart that has been only lightly impacted. No significant craters intersect the rim, and it is sloped about 1.5° toward the direction 50–90° from the Earth. The age of the crater is about 3.6 billion years and it has been in the proximity of the south lunar pole for at least the last two billion years.

Because the orbit of the Moon is tilted only 5° from the ecliptic, the interior of this crater lies in perpetual darkness. Estimates of the area in permanent shadow were obtained from Earth-based radar studies. Peaks along the rim of the crater are almost continually illuminated by sunlight, spending about 80–90% of each lunar orbit exposed to the Sun. Continuously illuminated mountains have been termed peaks of eternal light and have been predicted to exist since the 1900s.

The shadowed portion of the crater was imaged with the Terrain Camera of the Japanese SELENE spacecraft using the illumination of sunlight reflected off the rim. The interior of the crater consists of a symmetrical 30° slope that leads down to a  diameter floor. The handful of craters along the interior span no more than a few hundred meters.

Under these conditions, the estimated rate of loss from any ice in the interior would be 10−26 to 10−27 m/s. Any water vapor that arrives here following a cometary impact on the Moon would lie permanently frozen on or below the surface. However, the surface albedo of the crater floor matches the lunar far-side, suggesting that there is no exposed surface ice.

This crater was named after Ernest Shackleton, an Anglo-Irish explorer of Antarctica from 1901 until his death in 1922. The name was officially adopted by the International Astronomical Union in 1994. Nearby craters of note include Shoemaker, Haworth, de Gerlache, Sverdrup, Slater, and Faustini. Somewhat farther away, on the eastern hemisphere of the lunar near side, are the larger craters Amundsen and Scott, named after two other early explorers of the Antarctic continent.

Exploration 

From the perspective of the Earth, this crater lies along the southern limb of the Moon, making observation difficult. Detailed mapping of the polar regions and farside of the Moon did not occur until the advent of orbiting spacecraft. Shackleton lies entirely within the rim of the immense South Pole-Aitken basin, which is one of the largest known impact formations in the Solar System. This basin is over 12 kilometers deep, and an exploration of its properties could provide useful information about the lunar interior.

A neutron spectrometer on board the Lunar Prospector spacecraft detected enhanced concentrations of hydrogen close to the northern and southern lunar poles, including the crater Shackleton. At the end of this mission in July 1999, the spacecraft was crashed into the nearby crater Shoemaker in the hope of detecting from Earth-based telescopes an impact-generated plume containing water vapor. The impact event did not produce any detectable water vapor, and this may be an indication that the hydrogen is not in the form of hydrated minerals, or that the impact site did not contain any ice. Alternatively, it is possible that the crash did not excavate deeply enough into the regolith to liberate significant quantities of water vapor.

From Earth-based radar and spacecraft images of the crater edge, Shackleton appears to be relatively intact; much like a young crater that has not been significantly eroded from subsequent impacts. This may mean that the inner sides are relatively steep, which may make traversing the sides relatively difficult for a robotic vehicle. In addition, it is possible that the interior floor might not have collected a significant quantity of volatiles since its formation. However other craters in the vicinity are considerably older, and may contain significant deposits of hydrogen, possibly in the form of water ice. (See Shoemaker (lunar crater), for example.)

Radar studies preceding and following the Lunar Prospector mission demonstrate that the inner walls of Shackleton are similar in reflective characteristics to those of some sunlit craters. In particular, the surroundings appear to contain a significant number of blocks in its ejecta blanket, suggesting that its radar properties are a result of surface roughness, and not ice deposits, as was previously suggested from a radar experiment involving the Clementine mission. This interpretation, however, is not universally agreed upon within the scientific community. Radar images of the crater at a wavelength of 13 cm show no evidence for water ice deposits.

Optical imaging inside the crater was done for the first time by the Japanese lunar orbiter spacecraft Kaguya in 2007. It did not have any evidence of significant amount of water ice, down to the image resolution of 10 m per pixel.

On November 15, 2008, a 34-kg probe made a hard landing near the crater. The Moon Impact Probe (MIP) was launched from the Indian Chandrayaan-1 spacecraft and reached the surface 25 minutes later. The probe carried a radar altimeter, video imaging system, and a mass spectrometer, which will be used to search for water.

Potential uses 

Some sites along Shackleton's rim receive almost constant illumination. At these locales sunlight is almost always available for conversion into electricity using solar panels, potentially making them good locations for future Moon landings. The temperature at this site is also more favorable than at more equatorial latitudes as it does not experience the daily temperature extremes of 100 °C when the Sun is overhead, to as low as −150 °C during the lunar night.

While scientific experiments performed by Clementine and Lunar Prospector could indicate the presence of water in the polar craters, the current evidence is far from definitive. There are doubts among scientists as to whether or not the hydrogen is in the form of ice, as well as to the concentration of this "ore" with depth below the surface. Resolution of this issue will require future missions to the Moon. The potential presence of water suggests that the crater floor could be "mined" for deposits of hydrogen in water form, a commodity that is expensive to deliver directly from the Earth.

This crater has also been proposed as a future site for a large infrared telescope. The low temperature of the crater floor makes it ideal for infrared observations, and solar cells placed along the rim could provide near-continuous power to the observatory. About 120 kilometers from the crater lies the 5-km tall Malapert Mountain, a peak that is perpetually visible from the Earth, and which could serve as a radio relay station when suitably equipped.

In 2006, NASA named the rim of Shackleton as a potential candidate for its lunar outpost, originally slated to be up and running by 2020 and continuously staffed by a crew by 2024. The location would promote self-sustainability for lunar residents, as perpetual sunlight on the south pole would provide energy for solar panels. Furthermore, the shadowed polar regions are believed to contain the frozen water necessary for human consumption and could also be harvested for fuel manufacture. The crater is a major landing site candidate for the Artemis program and could be explored by a crew starting in 2024 with the first lunar outpost in 2028.

In popular culture 

Shackleton plays prominently in the alternate history television drama series For All Mankind. In the program, astronauts in a fictionalized version of the Apollo 15 mission land near Shackleton in 1971 and discover water ice in the crater walls. Later, the United States and the Soviet Union establish competing, crewed bases next to the crater to take advantage of the ice for drinking, oxygen and other uses.

Shackleton was also the site of the first lunar base in Mass Effect.  It was chosen as a location due to its hypothesised water ice deposits.

See also 

 Colonization of the Moon
 Lunar ice
 Lunar south pole

References

External links 
  Shackleton Crater Topography Visualization from NASA LRO
 
 
 
 
 
 

LQ30 quadrangle
Impact craters on the Moon